Ponga is a rural locality (a settlement) in Nimengskoye Rural Settlement of Onezhsky District, Arkhangelsk Oblast, Russia. The population was 87 as of 2010. There are 8 streets.

Geography 
Ponga is located 15 km south of Onega (the district's administrative centre) by road. Shasta is the nearest rural locality.

References 

Rural localities in Onezhsky District